Michael Costello may refer to:
 Michael Costello (public servant), ex-chief of staff to Australian politician Kim Beazley
 Michael A. Costello (born 1965), State Representative for the Massachusetts House of Representatives
 Michael Costello (fashion designer) (born 1983), American fashion designer and contestant on Project Runway
 Michael Copps Costello (1875–1936), Canadian politician
 Mike Costello, British sports broadcaster
 Michael Joe Costello (1904–1986), Irish Army general
 Mick Costello (born 1936), British communist activist